Accra Great Olympics is a Ghanaian professional football club based in Accra, Greater Accra. The club is currently competing in the Ghana Premier League. It has won the Ghana Premier League twice, in 1970, 1974 and the Ghana FA Cup thrice, in 1975, 1983 and 1995. Since its inception the club has forged a fierce rivalry between their neighbours Accra Hearts of Oak which has culminated into interesting game weeks over the years when the two face each other.

History 
The club was formed in 1954 in Accra, Greater Accra Region of Ghana. It celebrated its 52nd anniversary in 2006, and their 66th in 2020.

2020 
The club is currently coached by Annor Walker assisted by Yaw Preko and captained by Ghanaian 2009 U-20 World Cup champion Gladson Awako.

Grounds 
The club plays their matches at the Accra Sports Stadium.

Current squad

Honours
Ghana Premier League
Champions 1970, 1974
Ghanaian FA Cup
Winners 1975, 1983, 1995

Performance in CAF Competitions
 African Cup of Champions Clubs: 2 appearances
1971: Semi-Final
1975: First Round

CAF Cup: 1 appearance
1999 – First Round

CAF Cup Winners' Cup: 4 appearances
1984 – Second Round
1992 – Second Round
1996 – withdrew in First Round
2000 – First Round

Participation in CAF Competitions 

1- Great Olympics withdrew

Managers 
Annor Walker (head coach) 2020–

Yaw Preko (assistant head coach) 2020–

Godwin Attram  (assistant head coach) 2020–2021

Previous notable coaches 
Cecil Jones Attuquayefio (1974-1984)

David Duncan (2001-2003)

Ken Augustt (2011-2012)

Godwin Attram (2017)

Yaw Preko (2020)

Seasons 
2020–21 Accra Great Olympics F.C. season

External links
 Official Twitter account
 
 Great Olympics category (ghana scoccernet)

References

Football clubs in Ghana
Football clubs in Accra
1954 establishments in Gold Coast (British colony)
Association football clubs established in 1954
Accra Great Olympics F.C.